Brookesia bonsi is a species of chameleons, a lizard in the family Chamaeleonidae. The species is endemic to Madagascar, and was initially described by Guy A. Ramanantsoa in 1980. The International Union for Conservation of Nature ranked this species as Critically Endangered.

Etymology
The specific name, bonsi, is in honor of French herpetologist Jacques Bons (born 1933).

Distribution and habitat
Brookesia bonsi is endemic to Namoroka National Park in Soalala District, Mahajanga Province, northern Madagascar. Its type locality is the Tsingy de Namoroka Strict Nature Reserve. It is found on and restricted to the more humid parts of the reserve.

Reproduction
B. bonsi is oviparous.

Conservation status
Because of the small area in which it is found, the International Union for Conservation of Nature has ranked B. bonsi as Critically Endangered because the habitat continues to decline due to agriculture and the collection of wood. During a 1996 survey, the species was not considered rare, but during 2002, the species was not found on a 15-day survey of the nature reserve.

Taxonomy
Brookesia bonsi was originally described as a species new to science by herpetologist Guy A. Ramanantsoa in 1980. Authors who later published on this species were: Glaw and Vences (1994: 236), Nečas (1999: 276), and most recently Townsend et al. (2009). According to the Integrated Taxonomic Information System (ITIS), the taxonomic status of this species is valid.

References

Further reading
Glaw F, Vences M (1994). A Fieldguide to the Amphibians and Reptiles of Madagascar, Second Edition. Cologne, Germany: Vences & Glaw Verlag / Serpents Tale. 480 pp. . (Brookesia bonsi, p. 236).
Nečas, Petr (1999). Chameleons — Nature's Hidden Jewels. Frankfurt am Main: Chimaira. 348 pp. . (Brookesia bonsi, p. 276).
Ramanantsoa GA (1980). "Description de deux nouvelles espéces de Brookesia (Reptilia, Squamata, Chamaeleonidae): B. legendrei et B. bonsi". Bull. Mus. nat. Hist. nat., Paris 4 (1): 685-693. (Brookesia bonsi, new species). (in French).
Townsend TM, Vieites DR, Glaw F, Vences M (2009). "Testing Species-Level Diversification Hypotheses in Madagascar: The Case of Microendemic Brookesia Leaf Chameleons". Systematic Biology 58 (6): 641-656.

bonsi
Endemic fauna of Madagascar
Reptiles of Madagascar
Critically endangered fauna of Africa
Reptiles described in 1980
Madagascar dry deciduous forests